Beaverton is a town in Lamar County, Alabama, United States. At the 2010 census the population was 201, down from 226 in 2000.

Geography
Beaverton is located at  (33.932813, -88.020374).

The name Beaverton was first used by a man named Naylow Rodney in 1789 when he first encountered a large number of beavers at the site. The town was incorporated in 1910.

Demographics

As of the census of 2000, there were 226 people, 100 households, and 68 families residing in the town. The racial makeup of the town was 95.58% White, 3.10% Black or African American, and 1.33% from two or more races.

There were 100 households, out of which 21.0% had children under the age of 18 living with them, 55.0% were married couples living together, 13.0% had a female householder with no husband present, and 32.0% were non-families. 28.0% of all households were made up of individuals, and 15.0% had someone living alone who was 65 years of age or older. The average household size was 2.26 and the average family size was 2.75.

In the town, the population was spread out, with 19.5% under the age of 18, 4.9% from 18 to 24, 30.5% from 25 to 44, 21.7% from 45 to 64, and 23.5% who were 65 years of age or older. The median age was 42 years. For every 100 females, there were 96.5 males. For every 100 females age 18 and over, there were 85.7 males.

The median income for a household in the town was $20,250, and the median income for a family was $38,125. Males had a median income of $27,500 versus $12,019 for females. The per capita income for the town was $12,782. About 7.4% of families and 9.9% of the population were below the poverty line, including 14.3% of those under the age of eighteen and 18.6% of those 65 or over.

References

Towns in Lamar County, Alabama
Towns in Alabama